Jean Joseph Marie Alphonse Moutte (1840-1913) was a French painter in the Naturalist style, known for his genre scenes and coastal landscapes.

Biography
Later, he attended the  where he studied with Émile Loubon, among others., although his family intended for him to become a wheat broker. He did, in fact, work in that capacity for several years, but decided to become a full-time artist and went to Paris to work in the studios of Ernest Meissonier. His first exhibit at the Salon came in 1869, winning medals in 1881 and 1882.

In 1866, he married Thérèse Heraud. Their daughter, Marie Thérèse, would later marry one of his students; Jean-Baptiste Samat (1865-1931).

He returned to Marseille in 1891 and, four years later, succeeded Dominique Antoine Magaud as Director of the École. He soon became a prominent personality and his works could be seen in galleries throughout Provence. He continued to exhibit at the Salon until his death. He was awarded a silver medal at the Exposition Universelle (1889) and a bronze medal at the Exposition Universelle (1900). Among his best-known students were Jean-Baptiste Olive and the sculptor, Ary Bitter.

He was a good friend of Frédéric Mistral and participated in the activities of the Félibrige.  In 1892, he was elected a member of the Académie de Marseille and, in 1893, became a Chevalier in the Legion of Honor. A street in Marseille has been named after him.

References

Further reading 
 André Alauzen and Laurent Noet, Dictionnaire des peintres et sculpteurs de Provence-Alpes-Côte d'Azur, Jeanne Laffitte, 2006 
 Denis Coutagne, Bruno Ely and Jean-Roger Soubiran, Peintres de la couleur en Provence'1875-1920, Office Régional de la Culture Provence-Alpes-côte d'Azur 1995

External links 

  Alphonse Moutte @ emig.free.fr
 More works by Moutte @ ArtNet

1840 births
1913 deaths
Artists from Marseille
19th-century French painters
20th-century French painters